This article provides details of international football games played by the Kuwait national football team from 1961 to 1979.

Results

1961

1963

1964

1965

1966

1969

1970

1971

1972

1973

1974

1975

1976

1977

1978

1979

References 

Kuwait national football team results